David Clayton is a visual effects supervisor. Clayton and his fellow visual effects artists are nominated for an Academy Award for Best Visual Effects for the 2013 film The Hobbit: The Desolation of Smaug.
He was nominated one year earlier for The Hobbit: An Unexpected Journey.

External links

References

Visual effects supervisors
Living people
Year of birth missing (living people)